The Manoma is a river in Khabarovsk Krai, Russia. It is the main, right tributary of the Anyuy. It flows between Khabarovsk and Komsomolsk-on-Amur. It originates on the slopes of Sikhote-Alin mountain range. In its upper reaches it is a typical mountain river, downstream it flows through flat fields.

References

Rivers of Khabarovsk Krai